Lincoln Street Ventilation Stack is located at 57 Lincoln Street, at its intersection with Smith Street, Highgate, Western Australia.

History
The Lincoln Street Ventilation Stack is a prominent landmark in Highgate, a suburb of Perth, Western Australia.

The vent was intended to safely discharge acidic gas with the potential to damage Perth's sewer network and was hence built on top of Highgate Hill above a high point in the system. It proved unsuccessful, inadequately venting the sewer gas andunder certain weather conditionsdispersing what gas it vented over the surrounding houses and police station. It was sealed in 1941 after which it was referred to as "Dumas's Folly", after Chief Engineer of the Public Works Department, Russell Dumas.

A similar vent was planned for the suburb of Subiaco, but was never constructed.

In 1941 the Police Wireless Service moved to the adjacent Highgate Police Station, and the vent tower was put into service as a radio antenna. The move and the tower's new function were kept secretinitially to protect against Japanese air raids during World War IIand weren't revealed until 1956. The vent continued in this role until 1975 and several antennas are still visible on top of the structure.

The Lincoln Street Vent is listed with the National Trust of Australia and the State Register of Heritage Places.

Notes

References
ALP press release
HCWA assessment

Further reading

 The sanitary problem from the sewer gas point of view: sewer ventilation: the high shaft fallacy: protection of water supply Brown, William (London: Eyre and Pottiswoode, East Harding Street), 1898, Scholars Microform University of Western Australia
 Identifying Art Deco Facius, R in Trust News: The National Trust of Australia (W.A), 183rd Edition, September 1993

External links

The Lincoln Street Sewer Vent
Highgate – A Brief History of the Suburb

Art Deco architecture in Western Australia
Highgate, Western Australia
State Register of Heritage Places in the City of Vincent
Ventilation